233rd or 233d may refer to:

233d Aero Squadron, Re-designated as Squadron "E", July–November 1918
233rd (Northumbrian) Field Company, Royal Engineers, moved back into the Ypres Salient in December 1915
233rd Battalion (Canadiens-Français du Nord-Ouest), CEF, unit in the Canadian Expeditionary Force during the First World War
233rd Brigade, Royal Field Artillery, part-time unit of Britain's Royal Field Artillery created in 1908 as part of the Territorial Force
233rd Brigade (United Kingdom), infantry formation of the British Army in World War I and World War II
233rd pope (Pope Paul V) (1550–1621), born Camillo Borghese, was Pope from 16 May 1605 to his death in 1621
233rd Reserve Panzer Division (Wehrmacht), German panzer division during World War II which was mainly deployed in Denmark
233rd Street (IRT White Plains Road Line), local station on the IRT White Plains Road Line of the New York City Subway
East 233rd Street (Bronx), major thoroughfare in the New York City borough of The Bronx
East 233rd Street station or Woodlawn station (Metro-North), commuter rail stop on the Metro-North Railroad's Harlem Line

See also
233 (number)
233, the year 233 (CCXXXIII) of the Julian calendar
233 BC